Stylish...E is the debut studio album by South Korean singer Lee Hyori. It marked her first solo musical project since becoming a member of girl group Fin.K.L in 1998. The album sold well in South Korea, winning several awards and catapulting Lee to superstar status; papers even dubbed her popularity the "Hyori Syndrome". The album was released by DSP Media on August 13, 2003, and was distributed by CJ E&M Music. By 2004, the album had sold over 150,000 copies.

Background information
The first lead track was "10 Minutes", composed by Kim Do-hyun, who also composed "That's Right" from Shinhwa's 11th album The Classic in 2013.

"Hey Girl" was the follow-up single. The video was banned on some networks due to its sexual imagery, although Lee said that it was the same as her first video and therefore she did not see why this had to be banned. The single was not performed as frequently as the first one, and promotions for the album were completed soon after. The third single was "Remember Me".

Reception
The album was reportedly in such high demand that 70,000 copies were pre-ordered. The album's success allowed Hyori to become the highest-paid female artist in South Korea. It debuted at number three on the RIAK monthly chart for August 2003, selling 79,361 copies in the first month of its release. The music video for "10 Minutes" received a Mnet Music Video Festival award for Most Popular Music Video in 2003. In 2021, "10 Minutes" was ranked the 16th best K-pop song of all-time by Melon and Seoul Shinmun.

Accolades

Track listing

Credits and personnel
Credits adapted from album liner notes

Musicians
 Lee Hyori – vocals, chorus
 Yoon Il-sang – acoustic/electronic piano, chorus
 Jo Gyu-man – acoustic/electronic piano, chorus
 John+K, Mad SoulChild, Kim Ji-woong – acoustic/electronic piano
 Lee Geun-hyung, Hong Jun-ho, Ryu Hyeong-seop – acoustic guitar, electric guitar
 Ahn Jung-hoon – acoustic guitar, electric guitar, harmonica
 Huh Jae-hyuk – bass guitar
 Lee Seon-ah, Kang Seon-ju, Park Mi-hyun, Lee Jung-hyun, Kim In-seon, Kim Ji-sook, Lee Ji-yeon, Jo Hyun – first violin
 Lee Jang-woo, Son Tae-hee, Seon Woo-hyun, Kim Min-jung, Yoon Hyun-ji, Cha Hyun-ah, Lee Hyun-young, Kim Hye-jin – second violin
 Ahn Ji-woo, Kim Hye-sun, Park Geun-suk, Oh Hye-min, Ha Ji-hyun – viola
 Hong Mi-jeong, Um Jeong-hee, Ko Hyeon-jeong – cello
 Kim Da-young, Kim Hyuna, Lee Ji-eun, Soul-trip, Kim Hyo-su – chorus
 Choi Jae-hwa (DJ Rex) – scratch

Production and design
 Ahn Jung-hoon, Lee Hyori – production
 Kim Do-hyeon, Yoon Il-sang, Lee Chang-ui, Kim Ji-woong, Lee Hyun-do, Mad SoulChild, Jo Kyu-man, Bae Young-jun, Kim Seok-chan – computer programming
 Park In-young, Kim Ji-woong – string arrangement
 Jeong Moo-kyung, Ha Jung-su, Kim Young-sik, Kim Dong-hee, Choi Jae-young, Kim Hae-goo, Kim Gyun-jung, Choi Young-ui, Han Jae-eung, Kim Moon-hye – recording
 Im Chang-deok, Ko Seung-wook, Park Byeong-jun, Han Jong-jin, Jo Jun-seong, Jeong Doo-seok – mixing
 Choi Hyo-young (Sonic Korea) – mastering
 9g (Gugram Design) – design, artwork
 Yoon Woo-taek – photography
 Jeong Bo-yoon, Jang Hyo-jin, Park Mi-ra – stylist
 Myungjin Art – printing
 Gil Jong-hwa, Shim Byeong-cheol, Yoon Woo-taek, Choi Sung-pil, Yoon Hong-kwan – management
 Lee Ho-yeon (DSP Entertainment) – executive producer

Charts and sales

Monthly charts

Yearly charts

Sales

References

2003 debut albums
Lee Hyori albums